Centralia Big Hanaford power plant is a major coal-fired power plant supplemented with newer natural-gas-fired units. It is located east of Centralia, Washington, United States in Lewis County. It is the only commercial coal-fired power plant in the State of Washington.  A bill signed in 2011 by governor Christine Gregoire, the TransAlta Energy Transition Bill, resulted in one coal boiler being shut down in 2020 and the other by the end of 2025.

Generating units

Coal-fired
The two identical coal-fired generating units have a combined capacity of 1,340 MW. Both units started up for commercial operation in August 1971. (Bonneville Power Administration 1980 EIS)

In 2011, a deal was struck between the plant owner and operator, TransAlta, Governor Christine Gregoire, and Washington State environmental groups and policy makers to shut down the coal boilers.  The first was shut down in 2020, and the second will be in 2025, with a schedule of emissions reductions to be met along the way.  The Washington State Senate approved the deal with a 36–13 vote. To complete this transition, TransAlta is receiving an expedited permit, and is also exempt from any Environmental Impact Assessment that would otherwise be required.

Gas-fired
In 2002, the plant capacity was supplemented with five natural gas-fired units. Four of them are 50-MWe gas turbine (GT) units, and the fifth is a 68-MWe steam cycle unit.  The entire arrangement is known as combined cycle 4-on-1 where the exhaust from the 4 GT's creates steam via Heat Recovery Steam Generators (HRSGs) to power a single steam turbine. In 2014, the gas fired portion of the plant known as the "Big Hanaford Plant" was removed from the plant footprint and parted out to various buyers.

Fuel supply
Seventy percent of sub-bituminous coal used by the plant was delivered by truck from the nearby Centralia Coal Mine, which was a strip mine and the largest coal mine in the state of Washington, until it closed down on November 27, 2006. Coal from the Powder River Basin in Montana and Wyoming has also been transported by rail to be burned at the plant since 1989, but was only used to supplement Centralia Coal mine coal until 2006. By 2008, the plant was burning 100% Powder River basin coal. Rail upgrades and SO2 scrubber upgrades to ensure plant releases less pollution would have ensured the plant runs for at least another 15–20 years. Before the closure of unit 1 Centralia burned coal from about nine 110-car coal trains each week (i.e. 990 full coal cars).

Environmental and public impacts
Annually, this coal plant emits 350 pounds of mercury pollution, making it the state's largest single source of mercury pollution. Mercury pollution is a bio cumulative neurotoxin which causes brain damage in humans and is especially dangerous for children and pregnant or nursing mothers. The plant also emits 979,557 t CO2e (year 2019), making up a large portion of Washington State's total CO2 emissions.

All of the mining area is currently being reclaimed. When TransAlta bought the plant in 2000, it agreed to reduce emissions. It installed US$200 million worth of scrubbers on the plant, which were purchased from ABB Environmental Systems. Between 2010 and 2012, the Centralia Power Plant was offline for an average of 4 months of each year. In March 2009, a proposed agreement between TransAlta and the Washington State Department of Ecology was announced, regarding a significant step forward in improving air quality in Washington. Key to the agreement is TransAlta's willingness to voluntarily reduce mercury emissions by at least 50 percent by 2012 to address air quality concerns in the region. Capture testing took place in 2009 and an activated injection product was selected. The process will cost US$20 to $30 million over the next several years. Additionally, continuous emissions monitoring systems (CEMS) for mercury measurement was certified by the Energy & Environmental Research Center (EERC). As part of the same agreement between TransAlta and the Washington Department of Ecology, TransAlta agreed to reduce emissions of nitrogen oxide by 20 percent beginning in 2009. In 2012, Selective Non Catalytic Reduction (SNCR) system was installed to further reduce  at a cost of almost $20M.

Contractors for the power plant
The design and construction of the new plant were by  Stone & Webster and  ABB Environmental Systems.

Ownership
From the early 1970s until 2000, the plant was owned by eight utilities: PacifiCorp (47.5%), Avista Energy (15%), Seattle City Light (8%), Snohomish County PUD (8%), Tacoma Power (8%), Puget Sound Energy (7%), Grays Harbor County PUD (4%), and Portland General Electric (2.5%).

Plans to sell the plant began in 1998. In 2000, Portland General Electric sold its 2.5 percent share to Avista Energy, shortly before the plant was sold in its entirety to TransAlta Corporation for $554 million that same year.

References

External links
Power Technology – Centralia Power Plant New CCGT Unit, WA, USA

Natural gas-fired power stations in Washington (state)
Coal-fired power stations in Washington (state)
Centralia, Washington
Buildings and structures in Lewis County, Washington
Energy infrastructure completed in 1972